Limacina bulimoides is a species of gastropods belonging to the family Limacinidae.

The species has cosmopolitan distribution.

References

Limacinidae